Alyssa Wong is an American writer of speculative fiction, comics, poetry, and games. Wong is a recipient of the Nebula Award, World Fantasy Award, and Locus Award.

Wong studied fiction at North Carolina State University, graduating in 2017 with a Master of Fine Arts. In July 2018, Wong was hired by Blizzard Entertainment as a writer on Overwatch. Wong is the writer for Marvel Comics's Star Wars: Doctor Aphra comic series that began in 2020, in addition to writing the 2022 Deadpool series. Wong is non-binary and uses they/them pronouns.

Bibliography

Chapbooks
A Fist of Permutations in Lightning and Wildflowers (2016)

Short fiction
"The Fisher Queen" (2014)
"Scarecrow" (2014)
"Santos de Sampaguitas" (2014)
"Hungry Daughters of Starving Mothers" (2015)
"A Fist of Permutations in Lightning and Wildflowers" (2016)
"You'll Surely Drown Here If You Stay" (2016)
"Rabbit Heart" (2016)
"Natural Skin" (2016)
"The White Dragon" (2016)
"Your Bones Will Not Be Unknown" (2016)
"God Product" (2017)
"A Clamor of Bones" (2017)
"All the Time We've Left to Spend" (2018)
"What My Mother Left Me" (2018)
"Olivia's Table" (2018)
"What You Left Behind" (2019)

Poems
"For the Gardener's Daughter" (2015)

Essays
"Here's How It Goes" (2015)
"Buzzword" (2016)
"The H Word: The Darkest, Truest Mirrors" (2016)
"They Love Me Not: How Fictional Villains Saved My Life" (2016)

Comics

DC 
 DC The Doomed and the Dammed #1 (with Travis G. Moore, Saladin Ahmed, Marv Wolfman, John Arcudi, Kenny Porter, Amanda Deibert, Garth Ennis, Amedeo Turturro, and Brandon Thomas, 2020)
 Sensational Wonder Woman #6 (2021)
 Lazarus Planet: Dark Fate #1 (with Tim Seeley, Dennis Culver and A.L. Kaplan, 2022)
 Spirit World #1-6 (2023)

Marvel 

 Aero #1-12 (2019)
 Aero Vol. 2: The Mystery Of Madame Huang (2021)
 Carnage: Black, White & Blood #3 (with Karla Pacheco and Dan Slott, 2021)
 Deadpool #1- (2022–present) 
 Future Fight Firsts (2021)
 Future Fight Firsts: Luna Snow (2019)
 Iron Fist #1-5 (2022)
 The Legend Of Shang-Chi #1 (2021)
 Shang-Chi Infinity Comic (with Nathan Stockman, 2021)
 Star Wars: Doctor Aphra #1- (2020–Present)
Star Wars: War of the Bounty Hunters - Boushh #1 (2021)

Awards
2014 Nebula Award for Best Short Story (finalist), 2014 Shirley Jackson Award (finalist), 2015 World Fantasy Award for Best Short Story (finalist), for "The Fisher Queen".
2015 Nebula Award for Best Short Story (winner), 2016 World Fantasy Award for Best Short Story (winner), 2015 Shirley Jackson Award (finalist), 2016 Locus Award for Best Short Story (finalist), 2015 Bram Stoker Award for Short Fiction, for "Hungry Daughters of Starving Mothers". 
2016 John W. Campbell Award for Best New Writer (finalist) (As well, an analysis by Io9 indicated that, if not for the Sad Puppies ballot manipulation campaign, Wong would have also been a finalist for the 2015 award.)
2017 Locus Award for Best Novelette (winner), 2016 Nebula Award for Best Novelette (finalist), 2017 Hugo Award for Best Novelette (finalist) for "You'll Surely Drown Here If You Stay".
2017 Locus Award for Best Short Story (finalist), 2016 Nebula Award for Best Short Story (finalist), 2017 Hugo Award for Best Short Story (finalist) for "A Fist of Permutations in Lightning and Wildflowers".

References

External links

Living people
American short story writers
American writers of Chinese descent
American writers of Filipino descent
Blizzard Entertainment people
Marvel Comics writers
People from Maricopa County, Arizona
Nebula Award winners
North Carolina State University alumni
Video game writers
Women science fiction and fantasy writers
World Fantasy Award-winning writers
Year of birth missing (living people)
American non-binary writers